This is a list of English words of Semitic origin other than those solely of Arabic origin or Hebrew origin.

Most of these words are found in ancient Greek writings, with the Greek word believed today to have come from a Semitic source.

Common words
 abba  from Aramaic ܐܒܐ abba 'father' (AHD)
 abbé  from Aramaic ܐܒܐ abba 'father' (AHD, MW)
 abbot  from Aramaic ܐܒܐ abba 'father' (AHD, MW)
 abracadabra  disputed (OED) + probably Balkan (WNW) + probably from Aramaic אבדא כדברא abhadda kedhabhra 'disappear as this word' (NI)
 adonis  from Phoenician 𐤍𐤏𐤃𐤀 adon 'lord' (AHD)
 aloe  from ancient Greek ἀλόη aloe (AHD) 'dried juice' (MW). Likely from a Semitic source. See Hebrew אהלים ahalim 'trees of lign' (SC), perhaps in turn from Dravidian
 alphabet  The ancient Greek word represents the first two letters of the Greek alphabet (alpha and beta). The Greeks got their alphabet from the Phoenician/Canaanite one. Compare Canaanite '''aleph 'ox' (AHD) + from Phoenician/Canaanite bet 'house' (AHD)
 apron  from Latin mappa 'cloth' (MW), probably from Hebrew  'fluttering banner' (WNW) + perhaps from Carthaginian (AHD)
 arbiter  from Latin arbitr-, arbiter 'judge' (MW), from Phoenician (AHD)
 babel  from (AHD, MW) Hebrew בלל balal 'confound' (SC) + in part from (AHD) Akkadian 𒇷𒄿 𒀊𒁀 bab-ilu 'gate of God' (MW)
 balm  from Greek βάλσαμον balsamon (AHD), probably of Semitic origin, similar to Hebrew basham 'aromatic substance' (MW)
 balsam  from Greek βάλσαμον balsamon (AHD), probably of Semitic origin, similar to Hebrew basham 'aromatic substance' (MW)
 bdellium  from Greek βδέλλιον bdellion (MW), from (AHD) Hebrew בְּדֹלַח bedolach (WNW) 'pieces' (SC) + from Assyrian 𒁍𒁺𒆷𒄷 budulḥu (WNW)
 byssus  from Greek bussos (AHD), perhaps from בוץ buts (WNW) 'linen cloth', from Semitic (MW) *b-w-tz 'to be white' (WNW)
 birr  from Arabic بير birr '100 cents' (MW), probably from Amharic (AHD)
 camel  from Greek κάμηλος kamelos (AHD). From Semitic. See Hebrew גמל gamal 'desert animal', Arabic jamal 'camel'.
 camisado  secondarily; by way of Spanish camisa, "shirt". But of dubious Semitic origin. See "chemise" below.
 camisole  from a southern-Romance diminutive of late Latin camisia. But questionably Semitic. See "chemise" below.
 cane, cannella, canister, cannelloni, cannon, cannula, canon, canyon  from Greek κάννα kanna (AHD), of Semitic origin. See Hebrew קָנֶה "qaneh" 'tube', 'reed' (WNW) + Assyrian qanu (WNW), similar to Arabic qanah 'hollow stick', 'reed' (MW)
 chemise from (Vulgar) Latin camisia (MW), itself from proto-Celtic. Ugaritic has qms 'garment' (AHD). That word is similar, and shows the same k>q pattern that the later Semitic loanwords show. But a Semitic origin for camisia is a minority position in scholarship.</p>
 cinnamon  from Greek κιννάμωμον  (MW), of Semitic origin, similar to Hebrew קִנָּמוֹן  'aromatic inner bark' (AHD)
 cumin  from Greek (AHD) κύμινον kyminon (MW), perhaps from Hebrew כמון kammon 'umbel' (WNW), similar to Akkadian  'carrot family plant' (MW)
 deltoid  from Greek delta (AHD), perhaps from Hebrew דלת daleth 'door' (WNW), similar to Phoenician dalt 'door' (AHD)
 earnest (money)  from (MW, AHD) Hebrew ערב arav 'pledge' (WNW) + from Canaanite irrabon 'pledge', 'surety' (AHD)
 fig  from Latin ficus, possibly from Phoenician or Paleo-Hebrew 𐤂𐤐 "pag", as found in 
 hyssop  from Greek (AHD) ὕσσωπος  (MW), of Semitic origin. Compare Hebrew אזוב ezobh 'mint herb' (WNW)
 iotacism  from Greek Ιώτα iota, a letter from (MW) Phoenician (AHD). Compare Hebrew יד yodh 'hand' (WNW).
 jot  from Matthew 5:18 transliterating Greek Ιώτα iota. The subtext was the Hebrew letter yodh as written in the Aramaic alphabet in that verse's setting.
 maudlin, madeleine, magdalen  from (NI) Greek Μαγδαλα 'Magdala' (WNW) (='tower'), perhaps from Hebrew גדל gadal 'large' (SC) and (MW) Aramaic Magdela 'Magdala' (OED) (='tower') (SC)
 map  from Latin mappa 'cloth' (MW). Said by Quintilian (1st century AD in Latin) to be a word of Punic origin. Compare Talmudic Hebrew  'fluttering banner' (Etymonline.com)(AHD)(WNW).
 mat  from Greek ματτα matta, of Semitic origin (MW), perhaps from Phoenician 𐤌𐤀𐤕𐤕𐤀 matta, similar to Hebrew מטה mitta 'bed', 'couch' (AHD)
 myrrh  English is from classical Latin myrrha which is from ancient Greek murra which is from a Semitic source; see Aramaic murra, Akkadian murru, Hebrew mōr, Arabic mur, all meaning myrrh.
 messiah  from Hebrew (AHD) משיח mashiah 'anointed' (MW) + in part from Aramaic (AHD) meshiha 'anointed' (MW)
 napkin  from Latin mappa 'cloth' (MW), probably from Hebrew  'fluttering banner' (WNW) + perhaps from Carthaginian (AHD)
 pharisee  from Aramaic (AHD) perisha 'separated', from (MW) פרש Hebrew parash 'separate' (SC), 'cleave' (WNW)
 sac, sack  from ancient Greek σάκκος sakkos. Of Semitic origin (OED); see Hebrew שק saq 'bag', 'sackcloth', from Phoenician, Aramaic/Syriac ܣܩܐ saqqa, similar to Akkadian saqqu (AHD)
 sapphire  from Latin sapphirus and Greek sappheiros, from a Semitic source. See Hebrew ספיר sappir 'precious stone' (AHD). The word is perhaps ultimately from Sanskrit शनिप्रिय sanipriya 'sacred to Sani'
 schwa  from Hebrew שוא schewa 'unstressed mid-central vowel' (MW), probably from Syriac ܫܘܝܐ shewayya 'equal' (AHD)
 shekel  from Hebrew (MW) שקל saqal 'weight', from Canaanite tql (AHD)
 souk  from Arabic سوق suq (AHD) 'market' (MW), from Aramaic ܫܘܩܐ/שוקא šuqa 'street', 'market', from Akkadian 𒊓𒆪 saqu 'narrow'
 sycamore  Ancient Greek συκόμορος  'fig tree', looks to be ancient Greek syko- 'fig' and ancient Greek moros 'mulberry tree'. But the Greek is perhaps from a Semitic source. See Hebrew שִׁקמָה shikma 'mulberry' (WNW).

Letter names
 alpha  from Greek Άλφα alpha, perhaps from Phoenician alef  'ox', 'leader' (WNW), from Canaanite 𐤀𐤋𐤐 alp 'ox' (AHD)
 beta  from Greek Βήτα beta, from Phoenician (WNW) + from Canaanite 𐤁𐤉𐤕 bet 'house' (AHD)
 gamma  from Greek Γάμμα gamma, perhaps from Phoenician גימ"ל gimel '
 delta  from Greek Δέλτα delta (AHD), perhaps from Hebrew דל"ת daleth 'door' (WNW) + of Semitic origin, similar to Phoenician 𐤕𐤋𐤀𐤃 dalt 'door' (AHD)
 zeta  from Greek ζήτα zeta, from Phoenician, similar to Aramaic ܙܝܢܐ zayin, Hebrew זי"ן zayin (AHD) 'weapon'
 eta  from Greek Ήτα eta, perhaps from Hebrew chet חי"ת (WNW) 'terror' (SC) + from (MW) Phoenician 𐤕𐤇 (AHD)
 theta  from Greek Θήτα theta, from (MW) Phoenician 𐤕𐤄𐤈, similar to Hebrew טי"ת tet (AHD) 'snake'
 iota  from Greek Ιώτα iota, perhaps from Hebrew יו"ד yodh 'hand' (WNW) + from (MW) Phoenician  𐤕𐤏𐤉 (AHD)
 kappa  from Greek Κάππα kappa, perhaps from Hebrew כ"ף kaph (WNW) 'palm of the hand' (MW) + from (MW) Phoenician 𐤅𐤀𐤊 (AHD)
 lambda  from Greek Λάμβδα lambda, perhaps from Hebrew למ"ד lamedh 'whip', 'club' (WNW) + from (MW) Phoenician 𐤃𐤌𐤀𐤋 (AHD)
 mu  from Greek Μυ mu, from Phoenician, similar to Hebrew מ"ם mem 'water' (AHD)
 nu  from Greek Νυ nu, perhaps from Hebrew נו"ן nun 'fish' (WNW) + of Semitic origin (AHD)
 pi  from Greek Πι pi, perhaps from Hebrew פ"א pe 'mouth' (WNW) + from (MW) Phoenician 𐤄𐤐 (AHD)
 rho  from Greek Ρω rho, perhaps from Hebrew רי"ש rosh 'head' (WNW) + from (MW) Phoenician 𐤔𐤏𐤓 (AHD)
 sigma  from Greek Σίγμα sigma, from Phoenician, similar to Hebrew סמ"ך samek (AHD) 'prop'
 tau  from Greek Ταυ tau, perhaps from Hebrew ת"ו taw (WNW) 'mark', 'cross' (MW) + from (MW) Phoenician 𐤅𐤀𐤕 (AHD)
 izzard  probably from French et zede 'and Z', in part from Greek ζήτα zeta (MW), from Phoenician, similar to Aramaic ܙܝܢܐ zayin, Hebrew זי"ן zayin (AHD) 'weapon'
 zed  from Greek ζήτα zeta (MW), from Phoenician, similar to Aramaic ܙܝܢܐ zayin, Hebrew זי"ן zayin (AHD) 'weapon'

See also
List of English words of Arabic origin
List of English words of Hebrew origin
List of loanwords in Assyrian Neo-Aramaic

References

AHD: American Heritage DictionaryFD: The Free Dictionary – ONLINE
MW: Merriam-Webster's Collegiate Dictionary – ONLINE
OED: Oxford English Dictionary – ONLINE
RHD: Random House Dictionary – ONLINE
NI: Webster's New International DictionarySC: Strong's ConcordanceWNW: Webster's New World Dictionary'': 3rd edition

Semitic